State Theatre or State Theater may refer to:

Australia 
 State Theatre, Adelaide, former cinema in Hindley Street built on the site of the old Wondergraph
 State Theatre (Melbourne), a theatre opened in 1984, part of the Arts Centre Melbourne
 State Theatre (Sydney), heritage-listed cinema built in the 1920s

United States

California 
 Golden State Theatre, also known as State Theatre, Monterey
 State Theatre (Oroville, California), listed on the National Register of Historic Places (NRHP) in Butte County
 State Theatre (Los Angeles)
 State Theatre (Red Bluff, California)

Delaware 
 State Theater (Newark, Delaware)

Florida
 Hippodrome State Theatre, Gainesville
 State Theatre (St. Petersburg, Florida)
 State Theatre (Plant City, Florida)

Indiana 
 Blackstone-State Theater, also known as State Theater, in South Bend

Kentucky 
 State Theatre (Elizabethtown, Kentucky), NRHP-listed in Hardin County

Louisiana 
 State Palace Theatre (New Orleans, Louisiana)

Maine 
 State Theatre (Portland, Maine)

Michigan
 State Theatre (Ann Arbor, Michigan)
 State Theatre (Bay City, Michigan)
 The Fillmore Detroit, formerly the State Theatre
 State Theatre (Kalamazoo, Michigan)
 State Theatre (Traverse City, Michigan)

Minnesota
 State Theatre (Minneapolis, Minnesota)
 Lyric Center for the Arts, formerly the State Theater, in Virginia, Minnesota

New Jersey 
 State Theatre (New Brunswick, New Jersey)

New Mexico 
 State Theater (Clovis, New Mexico)

New York
 State Theater (Ithaca, New York)
 Loew's State Theatre (New York City)
 David H. Koch Theater, formerly the New York State Theater, part of Lincoln Center
 Landmark Theatre (Syracuse, New York), originally named Loew’s State Theatre

Ohio
 State Theatre (Cleveland, Ohio)
 State Theater (Youngstown, Ohio)

Pennsylvania
 State Theatre (Easton, Pennsylvania)
 State Theatre (State College, Pennsylvania), a non-profit community theatre
 State Theatre Center for the Arts (Uniontown, Pennsylvania)

Virginia 
 State Theatre (Falls Church, Virginia), a 1936 restaurant and concert venue

Wisconsin
 State Theatre (Eau Claire, Wisconsin)
 State Theater (Milwaukee), a former movie theater

Other countries

 State Theatre (Hong Kong), China
 Kaunas State Musical Theatre, Kaunas, Lithuania
 State Theatre (Hamilton, New Zealand)
 State Jewish Theater (Romania), Bucharest, Romania
 State Theatre Košice, Slovakia
 South African State Theatre, Pretoria
 Turkish State Theatres, with venues in 19 cities
 State Cinema, Grays, Essex, England, UK once called Gray's State Theatre